The 2021–22 New Taipei Kings season was the franchise's 1st season, its first season in the P. LEAGUE+ (PLG), its 1st in New Taipei City. The Kings are coached by Ryan Marchand in his first year as head coach.

Draft 

The Kings acquired 2021 first-round draft pick from Taoyuan Pilots in exchange for 2022 first-round draft pick.

Standings

Roster

Game log

Preseason

Regular season

Playoffs

Player Statistics 
<noinclude>

Regular season

Playoffs

 Reference：

Transactions

Free Agency

Additions

Subtractions

Awards

End-of-Season Awards

Players of the Month

Players of the Week

References 

New Taipei Kings
New Taipei Kings seasons